Bilel Yaken (born 5 January 1981) is a retired Tunisian football defender.

References

1981 births
Living people
Tunisian footballers
CA Bizertin players
Espérance Sportive de Tunis players
Stade Tunisien players
Olympique Béja players
ES Métlaoui players
AS Gabès players
Association football defenders
Tunisian Ligue Professionnelle 1 players